John Dragonetti is an American composer, songwriter, and music producer based in Los Angeles, California.  He is also a founding member (along with Blake Hazard) of the band The Submarines.

Early life
Dragonetti was born in Jackson, MI. His family moved to Egypt, where his father was principal of the American School in Cairo, at age 5. He spent most of his childhood in Dubai, U.A.E before attending boarding school in Nicosia, Cyprus. After high school at TASIS in Cyprus, John moved to Boston to attend Berklee College of Music.

Pop career

Based in Boston in 1996, Dragonetti began recording on 4-track cassette under the moniker Jack Drag. These home recordings were released by the Chapel Hill-based label, Hep-Cat. He later signed to A&M Records and released the band’s only major label LP, Dope Box, which was produced by Chris Shaw. Dragonetti released two more self-produced Jack Drag albums, Aviating and The Sun Inside.

In 2006 he formed The Submarines with Blake Hazard. The band toured extensively and released three albums on Nettwerk Records. The group's songs were heavily placed in films, television shows, and commercials such as Nick & Norah’s Infinite Playlist and Nip/Tuck. Most notably was for Apple’s iPhone ad campaign. The company licensed two songs, "Submarine Symphonika" and "You, Me and the Bourgeoisie" from Honeysuckle Weeks.

Film and television 
Dragonetti's first film score was for Doug Pray's Surfwise. He has also worked extensively with director Brian Knappenberger, composing the music for The Internet's Own Boy and We Are Legion: The Story of the Hacktivists. Among his television scores are the FX series Married and AMC’s Small Town Security. Dragonetti has also composed music for commercials including Volkswagen, Lexus, and Coca-Cola.

Works

Film and television 
 Web of Make Believe: Death, Lies & the Internet - 2022
 Truth and Power - 2016
 Baby, Baby, Baby - 2015
 Married - 2015
 About Scout - 2015
 (Dis)Honesty: The Truth About Lies - 2015
 Ice Warriors: USA Sled Hockey - 2014
 The Internet's Own Boy - 2014
 Frontline - 2012-2013
 Freeloaders - 2012
 Small Town Security - 2012
 We Are Legion - 2012
 The Secret Life of Scientists and Engineers  - 2009-2011
 Big Ideas for a Small Planet - 2007-2009
 Surfwise - 2007
 Number 1 Single - 2006
 Father of the Pride - 2004-2005

Producer discography

Remixes

References

American male composers
21st-century American composers
People from Los Angeles
Living people
Year of birth missing (living people)
21st-century American male musicians